The 1977–78 Kentucky Wildcats men's basketball team were coached by Joe B. Hall. The team finished the season with a 30–2 record and SEC Championship and won the 1978 NCAA Championship over the Duke Blue Devils, 94–88. Hall remarked before the title game that "This season was without celebration for us."

Season summary
Those who witnessed it call Jack Givens' 41 point game against Duke in the 1978 NCAA championship game one of the finest performances in the game's history. Givens made 18-of-27 shots in leading Kentucky to its fifth national championship and first in 20 years. This team also had a pair of bruising frontcourt players in Mike Phillips and Rick Robey and a great point guard in Kyle Macy. The Wildcats went on exhibition tour of Japan in June following the season's end.

Schedule

Statistics
Jack Givens (6-4, Sr, F) 18.1 ppg
Rick Robey (6-10, Sr, F) 14.4 ppg
Kyle Macy (6-3, So, G) 12.5 ppg
James Lee (6-5, Sr, F) 11.3 ppg
Mike Phillips (6-10, Sr, C) 10.2 ppg
Truman Claytor (6-1, Jr, G) 6.9 ppg

Awards and honors
 Jack Givens, NCAA Men's MOP Award

Team players drafted into the NBA

References

Kentucky
Kentucky Wildcats men's basketball seasons
NCAA Division I men's basketball tournament championship seasons
NCAA Division I men's basketball tournament Final Four seasons
Kentucky
Kentucky Wildcats
Kentucky Wildcats